Natchitoches Regional Airport  is a city-owned public-use airport located two nautical miles (4 km) south of the central business district of Natchitoches, a parish seat of Natchitoches Parish, Louisiana, United States.

Although most U.S. airports use the same three-letter location identifier for the FAA and IATA, this airport is assigned IER by the FAA but has no designation from the IATA.

The airport is the location of the plane crash which claimed the lives of Jim Croce and several others at 9:45 PM CDT on September 20, 1973, less than an hour after the end of Croce's last concert.

Facilities and aircraft 
It has two asphalt paved runways: 17/35 is 5,003 by 150 feet (1,525 x 46 m) and 7/25 is 4,000 by 100 feet (1,219 x 30 m).

For the 12-month period ending July 10, 2008, the airport had 15,715 aircraft operations, an average of 43 per day: 98% general aviation, 1% air taxi and 1% military. At that time there were 45 aircraft based at this airport: 82% single-engine, 9% multi-engine, 2% jet, 4% helicopter and 2% ultralight.

References

External links 
 Northwestern State University: Flight training facility at Natchitoches
 

Airports in Louisiana
Buildings and structures in Natchitoches Parish, Louisiana
Natchitoches, Louisiana
Transportation in Natchitoches Parish, Louisiana